Pato Branco Esporte Clube, commonly known as Pato Branco, is a Brazilian football club based in Pato Branco, Paraná state.

History
The club was founded on November 5, 1979. They won the Campeonato Paranaense Second Level in 1981 and in 1986, and the Campeonato Paranaense Third Level in 2007.

Achievements
 Campeonato Paranaense Second Level:
 Winners (2): 1981, 1986
 Campeonato Paranaense Third Level:
 Winners (1): 2009

Stadium
Pato Branco Esporte Clube play their home games at Estádio Os Pioneiros. The stadium has a maximum capacity of 1,500 people.

References

Association football clubs established in 1979
Football clubs in Paraná (state)
1979 establishments in Brazil
Pato Branco